Purdy is an unincorporated community in Greensville County, Virginia, United States. The community is located along Virginia Secondary Route 608(Wyatt's Mill Road) and Virginia Secondary Route 619(Purdue Road) east of Willow Oaks, and west of Jarratt. The Nottoway River is just North of Pudy and has an accessible boat ramp.

References

Unincorporated communities in Greensville County, Virginia
Unincorporated communities in Virginia